João Leonardo may refer to:

 João Leonardo (footballer, born 1985), João Leonardo de Paula Reginato, Brazilian football centre-back
 João Leonardo (footballer, born 1994), João Leonardo Risuenho do Rosário, Brazilian football striker